Greek Basket League awards are the yearly individual awards that are given by the 1st-tier professional basketball league in Greece, the Greek Basket League.

Since the 2014–15 season, the awards are voted on by the fans online, whereas previously they were not. The voting is currently decided by a ratio of 40% by the fans and the media, and 60% by the coaches and the captains of each of the teams of the Greek Basket League. However, the Most Popular Player and Women's Favorite Player awards are decided exclusively by the fan's online voting.

MVP

Regular Season Performance Index Rating Leader (2014–15 & 2015–16)
This list includes the regular season leaders in Performance Index Rating (PIR) of the Greek Basket League, of the 2014–15 season and the 2015–16 season.

In the 2014–15 and 2015–16 seasons, the Greek Basket League's regular season PIR leader was considered to be an unofficial statistical "MVP award", that was based solely on this statistic. This is not to be confused with the official Greek Basket League MVP award, which is an award that is based on a voting process, and that is awarded at the end of each season's playoffs.

Source: widgets.baskethotel.com/site/esake

Finals MVP

Best Young Player

Best Defender

Most Improved Player

Best Coach

Most Spectacular Player

Most Popular Player
The Most Popular Player Award is given to the player that is voted as being the most popular player in the league.

Women's Favorite Player
The Women's Favorite Player Award is given to the player that is voted as being the favorite player in the league, as chosen by female voters.

Greek League Best Five
In some years there are actually 6 players selected to the team, due to the result of ties in the voting.

For a listing of all of the Greek League Pentad Best Five teams,

References

External links
 Official Greek Basket League Site 
 Official Greek Basket League YouTube Channel 
 Official Hellenic Basketball Federation Site 
 Basketblog.gr 
 GreekBasketball.gr 

 
Greek Basket League